The 2022 Autotrader EchoPark Automotive 500 was a NASCAR Cup Series race held on September 25, 2022, at Texas Motor Speedway in Fort Worth, Texas. Contested over 334 laps on the 1.5 mile (2.4 km) intermediate quad-oval, it was the 30th race of the 2022 NASCAR Cup Series season, fourth race of the Playoffs and first race of the Round of 12.

Report

Background

Texas Motor Speedway is a speedway located in the northernmost portion of the U.S. city of Fort Worth, Texas – the portion located in Denton County, Texas. The track measures  around and is banked 24 degrees in the turns, and is of the oval design, where the front straightaway juts outward slightly. The track layout is similar to Atlanta Motor Speedway and Charlotte Motor Speedway (formerly Lowe's Motor Speedway). The track is owned by Speedway Motorsports, Inc., the same company that owns Atlanta and Charlotte Motor Speedway, as well as the short-track Bristol Motor Speedway.

Entry list
 (R) denotes rookie driver.
 (i) denotes driver who is ineligible for series driver points.

Practice

Practice results

Qualifying

Qualifying results

Race
Throughout the race, several drivers suffered from tire failures; Corey LaJoie and Kevin Harvick's crew chief Rodney Childers suggested the issue was due to practice of teams running lower tire pressures than Goodyear suggested in pursuit of speed due to restrictions on suspension shock travel on the Next Gen car, with Childers suggesting that the track's configuration worsened the issue. One tire failure in particular, Alex Bowman's on lap 98, resulted in Bowman being diagnosed for concussion-like symptoms after a rear impact crash for which Bowman was forced to sit out the rest of Round of 12 and Round of 8 races.

On lap 168, Cody Ware suffered from a hard crash, colliding with the turn 4 wall before violently hitting the pit wall, sustaining an impaction fracture on his ankle from the crash. Despite the wreck, Ware was cleared to compete for the next race.

Stage Results

Stage One
Laps: 105

Stage Two
Laps: 105

Final Stage Results

Stage Three
Laps: 124

Race statistics
 Lead changes: 36 among 19 different drivers
 Cautions/Laps: 16 for 91 (track high)
 Red flags: 1 for 56 minutes
 Time of race: 4 hours, 21 minutes and 53 seconds
 Average speed:

Penalties
William Byron was initially fined $50,000 and fined 25 driver and owner points for spinning Denny Hamlin during a late caution period. NASCAR initially did not notice the incident during the race, and the penalty was applied two days later. Ty Gibbs was also fined $75,000 and docked 25 owner points (as Gibbs competed for Xfinity Series points, he received no driver point penalties) for contact with Ty Dillon on the pit road. It was Gibbs' second penalty for dangerous driving on the pit road, as he had also been penalized for doing the same against Sam Mayer at the Call 811 Before You Dig 250 in the Xfinity Series that led to a fistfight after the aforementioned race.

On October 6, 2022, Byron's points penalty was overturned, but NASCAR increased the fine to $100,000. Subsequent to the appeal, NASCAR updated their rulebook so that further incidents like Byron's can result in both fines and point penalties, not just one of them.

Media

Television
USA covered the race on the television side. Rick Allen, Two–time Texas winner Jeff Burton, Steve Letarte and 2000 Texas winner Dale Earnhardt Jr. called the race from the broadcast booth. Kim Coon, Parker Kligerman and Marty Snider handled the pit road duties from pit lane.

Radio
PRN had the radio call for the race, which was also simulcast on Sirius XM NASCAR Radio. Doug Rice & Mark Garrow covered the action for PRN when the field raced down the front straightaway. Rob Albright covered the action for PRN from a platform outside of Turns 1 & 2, & Pat Patterson covered the action from a platform outside of Turns 3 & 4 for PRN. Brad Gillie, Brett McMillan and Wendy Venturini had the call from pit lane for PRN.

Standings after the race

Drivers' Championship standings

Manufacturers' Championship standings

Note: Only the first 16 positions are included for the driver standings.

Notes

References

Autotrader EchoPark Automotive 500
Autotrader EchoPark Automotive 500
NASCAR races at Texas Motor Speedway
Autotrader EchoPark Automotive 500
NASCAR controversies